Jalgaon Airport  is a domestic airport located off National Highway 753F southeast of the city of Jalgaon in Maharashtra, India. It has flights to Mumbai, Ahmedabad, Nanded, and Kolhapur operated by TruJet. Jalgaon Airport is 47 km away from the Ajanta Caves for which it is its closest airport.

History
Jalgaon Airport was built in 1973 by the Public Works Department. The Jalgaon Municipal Council took over its operations from April 1997 and handed it over to the Maharashtra Airport Development Company in April 2007. The Government of Maharashtra signed a Memorandum of Understanding (MoU) with the Airports Authority of India (AAI) to upgrade the existing airfield in July 2009.
The then President of India, Pratibha Patil laid the foundation stone for the development and expansion of the Jalgaon Airport in June 2010. The AAI completed the first phase of work worth Rs. 61 crores in Feb 2012 including an apron and a taxiway. The revamped airport was inaugurated on 23 March 2012 by President Pratibha Patil.

In 2016, the Government of Maharashra signed up for the Ministry of Civil Aviation's regional connectivity scheme (RCS) called UDAN that would fast-track the development of ten regional airports in the state including Jalgaon.
Under UDAN, Air Deccan won the contract to start flights from Jalgaon to Mumbai. The airline flew the first ever scheduled commercial flight into Jalgaon airport on 23 December 2017.
However the airline stopped the flights within months, citing technical issues.
The Government cancelled the contract and the route was allotted to TruJet.
TruJet started operating from Jalgaon from 1 September 2019.

Structure
Jalgaon Airport is spread over 630 acres and has one runway oriented 09/27, 1,700 metres in length. Its new apron measuring 68 metres by 67 metres provides parking space for 2 ATR aircraft at a time. The runway has basic approach and runway edge lighting. Navigational and landing aids at this airport includes a DVOR/DME and a PAPI (Runway 27 & Runway 09). The 700 square metre terminal building can accommodate 50 passengers.

Statistics

References

Airports in Maharashtra
Jalgaon
Airports established in 1973
1973 establishments in Maharashtra
20th-century architecture in India